Lakkidi railway station (code: LDY) is a railway station in Palakkad District, Kerala and falls under the Palakkad railway division of the Southern Railway zone, Indian Railways.

Railway stations in Palakkad district